Narosa fulgens is a moth in the family Limacodidae. It is found in Taiwan, Korea and Japan.

References

Moths described in 1889
Limacodidae
Moths of Japan
Moths of Asia
Taxa named by John Henry Leech